Kevon Pierre (born March 30, 1982) is a sprinter from Trinidad and Tobago. Pierre traveled to the 2005 World Championships having set personal bests in both 100 and 200 metres (10.22 and 20.47) two months prior to the meet. He competed in the 200 metres contest, but was knocked out in the heats. In the 4 × 100 m relay event, however, he and the rest of the Trinidad and Tobago team won a silver medal. Kevon became a teacher at Coral Park Senior High School and coached track and field.  He is currently pursuing a master's degree in biology and no longer teaches.

Achievements

External links
 

1982 births
Living people
Trinidad and Tobago male sprinters
Athletes (track and field) at the 2006 Commonwealth Games
World Athletics Championships medalists
Central American and Caribbean Games silver medalists for Trinidad and Tobago
Competitors at the 2006 Central American and Caribbean Games
Central American and Caribbean Games medalists in athletics
Commonwealth Games competitors for Trinidad and Tobago